Vobkent FK was an Uzbekistani football club based in Bukhara. The club used to play in the top division in Uzbek football, and dissolved in 2008 after the relegation of the Uzbek League.

References

Defunct football clubs in Uzbekistan
Association football clubs established in 2002
Association football clubs disestablished in 2008
2002 in Uzbekistan
2008 in Uzbekistan
Football clubs in Uzbekistan